Bridges Division is a Bangladesh government division under the Ministry of Road Transport and Bridges responsible for construction of all bridges which are longer than 1.5 kilometer in Bangladesh.

History
Bridges Division was established in March 2008 under the Ministry of Road Transport and Bridges to oversee the construction of bridges. On 14 October 2013, the Bridges Division signed an agreement with Bangladesh Army for consulting work on Padma Bridge worth 1.3 billion taka. Bangladesh army requested further 17 billion taka to construct security facilities and Padma Cantonment at the bridge site.

References

2008 establishments in Bangladesh
Organisations based in Dhaka
Government agencies of Bangladesh
Government departments of Bangladesh